Caturidae is an extinct family of fishes belonging to the order Amiiformes (which contains the modern bowfin) which ranges from the Jurassic (possibly Triassic) to Cretaceous. Members of the family include Caturus, Strobilodus, Amblysemius, and Catutoichthys.

References

Biolib
 Paleobiology Database

Amiiformes
Prehistoric ray-finned fish families
Middle Triassic first appearances
Late Cretaceous extinctions